Asier Arranz Martín (born 28 March 1987), known simply as Asier, is a Spanish footballer who plays for CD Palencia Cristo Atlético as a left midfielder.

Club career
Asier was born in Cuéllar, Segovia, Castile and León. After emerging through Real Valladolid's youth ranks, he played 16 Segunda División games for the first team in the 2006–07 season as they returned to La Liga after a three-year hiatus.

Subsequently, Asier served two more loan spells in the second division, appearing very little for Deportivo Alavés and Xerez CD (the latter also promoted, but the player only took the pitch on 12 occasions, one match complete). After having featured only once for Valladolid in the first half of the 2009–10 campaign, in a rare start, at RCD Mallorca – but in a 3–0 loss– he was finally released in late January 2010, returning to the second tier with CD Numancia by signing until the end of the season and two more.

From 2010 onwards, Asier resumed his career in the Segunda División B and Tercera División, with Pontevedra CF, CD Teruel, Sestao River Club, Gimnástica Segoviana CF (two spells), Atlético Astorga FC and CD Palencia Balompié. He moved abroad at the age of 33, representing teams in Cyprus and Finland and achieving promotion to the Veikkausliiga with Kotkan Työväen Palloilijat.

References

External links

Cyprus Football Association profile 

1987 births
Living people
Sportspeople from the Province of Segovia
Spanish footballers
Footballers from Castile and León
Association football midfielders
La Liga players
Segunda División players
Segunda División B players
Tercera División players
Segunda Federación players
Real Valladolid Promesas players
Real Valladolid players
Deportivo Alavés players
Xerez CD footballers
CD Numancia players
Pontevedra CF footballers
CD Teruel footballers
Sestao River footballers
Atlético Astorga FC players
Cypriot Second Division players
Alki Oroklini players
Veikkausliiga players
Ykkönen players
Kotkan Työväen Palloilijat players
Spanish expatriate footballers
Expatriate footballers in Cyprus
Expatriate footballers in Finland
Spanish expatriate sportspeople in Cyprus
Spanish expatriate sportspeople in Finland